WYRR is a religious formatted radio station broadcasting on 88.9 FM. The station is licensed to Lakewood, New York, US, and serves the Jamestown, New York, area. WYRR is an affiliate of Jimmy Swaggart's SonLife Radio Network and is owned and operated by Family Worship Center Church, Inc.

References

External links

YRR
Chautauqua County, New York
2010 establishments in New York (state)
Radio stations established in 2010